Racism: A History is a three-part British documentary series originally broadcast on BBC Four in March 2007.

Episodes

External links

 Watch the 3 part series at Top Documentaries
 BBC Active: Racism: A History retrieved 2015.05.25

BBC television documentaries about history
2000s British documentary television series
2007 British television series debuts
2007 British television series endings
Documentaries about racism